Caecilia occidentalis is a species of caecilian in the family Caeciliidae. It is endemic to the Northwestern Andean montane forests (C.Michael Hogan. 2012) within Colombia. Its habitat is subtropical or tropical moist montane forest, plantation, rural gardens, urban area, and degraded former forest.

References

 C.Michael Hogan. 2012. Northwestern Andean montane forests. ed. Peter Saundry. Encyclopedia of Earth. National Council for Science and the Environment. Washington DC

occidentalis
Amphibians of Colombia
Endemic fauna of Colombia
Amphibians described in 1968
Taxonomy articles created by Polbot